Hilary Timmins is a New Zealand television personality.

Career
Hilary first appeared on New Zealand Television in 1986 after studying English literature and ancient history at Auckland University coupled with a busy modelling career – when she began her co-hosting role of the iconic NZ game show, It’s in the Bag.

Born in New Zealand to Scottish parents, Hilary went on to become a household name, appearing on many successful television shows for an unbroken 22 years.

In 1992, Hilary began her long association with the New Zealand Lotto; a relationship that continued until 2008 when she left to travel abroad. She fronted the weekly live Lotto Draw during this period, in addition to scripting and creating aspects of the production. Her involvement with Lotto also stretched to the directing of many community grants and celebrity inserts, as well as appearing in numerous brand commercials and fronting sponsorship and promotional campaign including the America's Cup and Festival of New Zealand.

In addition she worked constantly as a guest speaker and host of corporate and black tie fundraisers, public and civic functions, as well as high-profile product endorsement and commercials.

Hilary has been actively involved in community and charity work. She was the Chief Celebrity Ambassador for Variety New Zealand and has worked as an ambassador for Skylight children's charity and Victim Support. She has interviewed many celebrities and personalities including Michael Crawford, Dannii Minogue, Christina Aguilera, Jewell, Vanessa May, Jimeoin, Russell Watson and Jonah Lomu.

Highlights
 Filming “It’s In The Bag” from Scott Base, Antarctica.
 Co-anchoring various telethons
 Hosting and performing as a singer for the Live Lotto Draw in front of a crowd of 250,000 at Xmas in the Park, Auckland and Christchurch. 
 Being New Zealand's first female game-show host on Telebingo.
 Sailing during elimination races on the New Zealand America's Cup yacht “Black Magic”.

Hilary currently lives in London and recently wrote and directed the TV and educational series  "Dream Catchers", a series about inspirational New Zealanders in the UK. She is married to New Zealand film producer/financier Robert Whitehouse.

See also
 List of New Zealand television personalities

References

1965 births
Living people
New Zealand women television presenters
Mass media people from Dunedin